Choudhari Mulkiram or Mulkiram Choudhary (1910–1954) was a Hindi poet, philosopher and civil servant.

Personal life 
Choudhari Mulkiram was born into Chamar caste to Choudhari Dansahay at Hapur, United Provinces, British India. He completed his graduation from the Meerut College (U.P.) and was appointed as the Superintendent in the Dept. of Rural Development.

Career 
In 1939 he was selected as PCS officer and was first posted as Deputy Collector of Hardoi and also been Director of Social Welfare Department in U.P govt.

He entered into Hindi literary movement and chosen poetry as a mean to social reform. He befriended Krishna Dutt Paliwal and started working for Dalit movement and annihilation of castes. He also got influenced from Arya Samaj and worked for welfare of people.

An anthology of his poems, 'Hridayodgar' was published posthumously by Dr.Tarachand Pal Bekal.

References 

1910 births
1954 deaths
People from Hapur district
Hindi-language poets
20th-century Indian poets